NGC 1528 is an open cluster  in the constellation Perseus. It was discovered by William Herschel in 1790.  It is located in the north-eastern part of the constellation, just under 3 degrees north of μ Persei. Less than 1.5° to the southeast is the open cluster NGC 1545 (m = 6.2). The NGC 1528 is clearly visible with 10x50 binoculars. 165 stars are recognised as members of NGC 1528, the brightest of which has apparent magnitude 8.7.

See also 
 List of NGC objects (1001–2000)

References

External links 
 
 
 SEDS

1528
Perseus (constellation)
Open clusters
Discoveries by William Herschel